The Cameroonian football league system is a series of interconnected leagues for football clubs in Cameroon.

Men

National leagues

Regional and Departmental leagues

Women

External links
 FECAFOOT official website
 Allez les Lions website

  
Cameroon